Roach Sidney Stewart (January 28, 1881 – March 16, 1948) was a college football player and attorney. A native of Lancaster, South Carolina, he was the town's mayor from 1918 to 1922. He attended the University of North Carolina at Chapel Hill, where he co-founded the Order of the Golden Fleece,  the oldest honorary society at the university. As a member of the Tar Heels football team, Stewart was an All-Southern center.

References

External links

1948 deaths
1881 births
North Carolina Tar Heels football players
American football centers
20th-century American lawyers
All-Southern college football players
People from Lancaster, South Carolina
Players of American football from South Carolina